The 2014 World Championship of Ping Pong was a table tennis tournament.

Format
The tournament used standardized sand paper covered paddles, as opposed to the paddles used in table tennis events that have rubber surfaces with optional sponge underneath for more spin and speed. This ping pong tournament was held from 4 January 2014 to 5 January 2014 at the Great Hall in Alexandra Palace. The tournament was organized by the sport event promotion company Matchroom Sport. Russian Maxim Shmyrev won the tournament for the third year in a row.

Format
The format of the tournament consisted of sixty-four of the best ping pong players. The remaining thirty-two competed in a knockout form for the championship.

References

World Championship of Ping Pong
World Championship of Ping Pong
World Championship of Ping Pong
World Championship of Ping Pong
Alexandra Palace
International sports competitions hosted by England
Table tennis competitions in the United Kingdom
World Championship of Ping Pong